Trancers is an American action-science fiction film series started in 1984 by Empire Pictures, and continued by Full Moon Features. All but the most recent film star Tim Thomerson as Jack Deth, with the latest using stock footage from previous films.

The series consists of six feature films, one short film and two comic book miniseries.

Plot
Jack Deth is a cop in the 23rd century who travels back in time to 1984 to attempt to stop the creation of Trancers, an army of zombie-like humans for the first three movies. In films 4 and 5, an accident in the time machine causes Deth to be transported to a parallel world, the Land of Orpheus, to continue the fight against Trancers.

Films

Cast and characters
This table shows the principal characters and the actors who have portrayed them throughout the franchise.
A dark grey cell indicates the character was not in the film, or that the character's presence in the film has not yet been announced.
A  indicates a cameo appearance.
A  indicates an appearance in onscreen photographs only.
A  indicates an appearance in archival footage only.
A  indicates an uncredited role.
A  indicates a voice-only role.
A  indicates a younger version of the role.

Comic books
 In 1991, Eternity Comics released Trancers: The Adventures of Jack Deth, a two-issue miniseries which featured the tagline "All new adventures based on two hit films!"
 In 2015, Action Lab Comics released Full Moon Presents: Trancers, a three-issue miniseries.

References